Glocke (German "bell") may refer to:

A bell as a musical instrument
Die Glocke (magazine), German Marxist magazine 1915
Die Glocke (Bremen), concert hall in Bremen
Die Glocke (conspiracy theory), purported Nazi secret weapon, Nazi bell-shaped UFO
Die Glocke, literary group formed around Friedrich Wilhelm Hackländer
, 1917 silent film directed by Franz Hofer
, newspaper from Oelde, founded 1880
Das Lied von der Glocke, 1798 poem by Friedrich Schiller

See also

 
 Glock (disambiguation)